Hospental Castle or Langobarden Tower is a ruined medieval castle in the municipality of Hospental in the canton of Uri in Switzerland.  It is a Swiss heritage site of national significance.

See also
 List of castles and fortresses in Switzerland

References

Castles in the canton of Uri
Cultural property of national significance in the canton of Uri